David M. Fahey (born 1937, at Ossining, New York ) was a history professor at Miami University in Oxford, Ohio.  After his retirement in 2006, he continued (through 2010) to teach modern British and world history at Miami on a part-time basis.

Educated for his doctorate at the University of Notre Dame, Indiana he has written extensively on the Anglo-American temperance movement and, in particular, the Good Templar fraternal temperance society.  He served as president of the Alcohol and Temperance History Group (later reorganized as the Alcohol and Drugs History Society).  He is the author of Temperance and Racism: John Bull, Johnny Reb, and the Good Templars (University Press of Kentucky, 1996) and the editor of The Collected Writings of Jessie Forsyth, 1847-1937: The Good Templars and Temperance Reform on Three Continents (Edwin Mellen Press, 1988).  He served with Jack S. Blocker and Ian R. Tyrrell as an editor of Alcohol and Temperance in Modern History: An International Encyclopedia (ABC-CLIO, 2003).  Fahey was the first recipient of the Alcohol and Drugs History Society's senior scholar achievement award for lifetime service. and in 2015 received another ADHS service award.  He was a member of the editorial board, "Drugs and Alcohol: Contested Histories," a series published by Northern Illinois University Press.

Fahey also has been active in world history, primarily as a teacher and as an editor and participant in the listserv group H-World.  Recently he combined his interest in temperance history and world history in two articles, "Poverty and Purification: The Politics of Gandhi's Campaign for Prohibition" Historian 67/3 (Fall 2005), co-authored with Padma Manian, and "Temperance Internationalism: Guy Hayler and the World Prohibition Federation," in Social History of Alcohol and Drugs: An Interdisciplinary Journal 20/2 (Spring 2006).

As a by-product of his Good Templar research, he has developed an interest in African American fraternal societies.  This led to his editing of an early biography of William Washington Browne titled, The Black Lodge in White America: "True Reformer" Browne and His Economic Strategy (University Press of America, 1994).  He published a related article in Ethnic and Racial Studies.

Fahey also edited a posthumous collection of essays written by his friend Frank J. Merli, The Alabama, British Neutrality, and the American Civil War (Indiana University Press, 2004).

Fahey wrote many entries for the Oxford Dictionary of National Biography, the Biographical Dictionary of Modern British Radicals, and American National Biography.

Since retiring, Fahey has often written about United States history, for example, "Old-Time Breweries: Academic and Breweriana Historians," Ohio History 116 (2009).  In 2010 his book about the Women's Temperance Crusade in the village of Oxford, Ohio, was published.  It included a sketch of Dr. Alexander Guy (1800–1893) and his family and an excerpt from the memoir of his son Wm Evans Guy.

Fahey is senior editor for the documentary collection Milestones of World Religions.  He is co-editor of a historical encyclopedia of alcohol and drugs in North America, published in 2013.  He also edited E. Lawrence Levy's Autobiography of an Athlete (1913).  It was published in 2014 as E. Lawrence Levy and Muscular Judaism, 1851-1932: Sport, Culture, and Assimilation in Nineteenth-Century Britain.  In 2016 he published an article in Brewery History with the title, "Worrying about Drink," followed by several other articles in the same journal.  In 2019 he wrote a biographical sketch of the mid-Victorian reformer, Margaret Fison, for the International Social Science Review.  In 2020 he published a short book, Temperance Societies in Late Victorian and Edwardian England, followed in 2022 by The Politics of Drink in England, from Gladstone to Lloyd George.

His wife Dr. Mary J. Fuller, emerita professor of English at Miami University, served as director of the Ohio Writing Project from 1980 until 2012.

See also Patrick Geshan, “He’s not done yet: Miami professor Fahey just keeps publishing,” Oxford Observer, Sept.16, 2022, reprinted in Hamilton Journal-News, Sept. 24, 2022.

References

External links
 Bio at Miami University

See also
Alcohol and Drugs History Society
Temperance movement

1937 births
American temperance activists
British historians
Miami University faculty
University of Notre Dame alumni
Living people